"Teenage Superstar" is the debut single of Dutch pop rock music singer Kim-Lian.

Information 
The song was released on 4 September 2003 as the first single of her debut album Balance. It reached the top of the charts in Indonesia and ended on number five in the Netherlands.

Track listing 
CD single (Netherlands, Belgium)
"Teenage Superstar" [Radio Edit]
"Teenage Superstar" [B.T.S.Y. Mix]
"Teenage Superstar" [Enhanced Video]
"Superstar in Sweden" [Enhanced Video]

CD single (Sweden)
"Teenage Superstar" [Album Version]
"Teenage Superstar" [B.T.S.Y. Mix]

Music video 
The video was shot in a German carnival park, where Kim-Lian and her friends turn the park upside down. Throughout the scenes, Kim-Lian is shot in a big coupe singing with her band. The music couldn't be very loud in that coupe because the echo was too loud. It was released on 4 April 2005.

Charts

Weekly charts

Year-end charts

Belinda – Boba Niña Nice (Spanish Cover) 

"Boba Niña Nice" is the second single of Mexican pop/rock singer Belinda from her self-titled debut studio album Belinda.

Information 
The song was written by Daniel Gibson and Jörgen Ringqvist; adapted by Belinda, co-adapted and produced by Mauri Stern. It is a Spanish version of "Teenage Superstar" by Dutch singer Kim-Lian.

Track listing 
Mexican CD Single/Promo
 Boba Niña Nice

Music video 
The music video was directed by Victor González and released in December 2003. It starts with scenes of Belinda singing the song with a band on a building, these scenes are shown largely throughout the video. Later Belinda is shown walking with a group of friends and singing the song to a guy with a friend while sitting on a car.

The video continues with scenes of people skateboarding and biking, scenes of Belinda singing the song with different outfits, choreography and a dance battle.

Other Cover versions 
The song has been covered by Japanese singer Nami Tamaki ("High School Queen"), Mexican singer Belinda ("Boba Niña Nice"), Portuguese group D'ZRT ("Para mim tanto me faz"), Spanish group Efecto Mariposa ("Que más da"), Polish Czech singer Ewa Farna ("Měls mě vůbec rád" and "Razem sam na sam") and Korean singer MI:NE Cho Min Hye ("Teenage Superstar").

Already in Cúmplices do Coração, Carinha de Amor, Gotinha de Anjo, Thalita e o Palácio da Patrulha and its spin-off in dreams "Thalita e o Palácio da Patrulha: Aurora Dream" did a re-recording of the song with the name of "Um Banho de Aventuras", also has "Before the Throne Boy", still has the dubbed version in Japan "Ohayo Kimi wo Saikyou My Future!" and several versions are on the albums "Vai ter que Sorrir" and "Thanks for the memories", In the episode "Yago, the fighter - part 3: If the solitude of the sun catches me, even so I never will be down", they made a pot pourri in the voice of João, Yago and Luís Eduardo with the name of "Boba niña nice/Teenage Superstar" in the musical moment in the frame "Session Song: Return to the people"

References 

2003 singles
Kim-Lian songs
2003 songs
Songs written by Jörgen Ringqvist
Belinda Peregrín songs
Song recordings produced by Mauri Stern